The Merkys is a river in southern Lithuania and northern Belarus. It flows for  through Belarus,  along the Belarusian–Lithuanian border, and  through Lithuania before joining the Nemunas near Merkinė.

Merkys is mostly fed by underground streams and therefore is cooler during summers and has smaller fluctuations in water level than other rivers in Lithuania. Near Žagarinė ( before its mouth) the Merkys is connected with Lake Papys by a canal. The Vokė originates from this lake and consumes most of the Merkys' water.

The Merkys is a popular destination among water tourism enthusiasts as part of it belongs to the Dzūkija National Park and it flows into the Neman near the historical site of Merkinė. Archaeological findings show that people inhabited the area as early as the Mesolithic period. The Merkys is known for its diverse fauna, being declared a reservoir for trout in 1974.

Name
The name of the river, Merkys, originate from merkti, an appellative word in the Lithuanian language meaning to soak.

References

Rivers of Grodno Region
Rivers of Lithuania
International rivers of Europe
Rivers of Belarus